The Copa Polla Gol 1980 was the 10th edition of the Chilean Cup tournament. The competition started on February 13, 1980 and concluded on April 13, 1980. Only first level teams took part in the tournament. Deportes Iquique won the competition for their first time, beating Colo-Colo 2–1 in the final. The points system in the first round awarded 2 points for a win, increased to 3 points if the team scored 4 or more goals. In the event of a tie, each team was awarded 1 point, but no points were awarded if the score was 0–0.

Calendar

Group Round

Group 1

Group 2

Group 3

Group 4

Quarterfinals

|}

Semifinals

Final

Top goalscorers
 Miguel Neira (O'Higgins) 9 goals,
 Fidel Dávila (D. Iquique) 9 goals

See also
 1980 Campeonato Nacional

References

RSSSF

Chile
1980
Copa